St-Martin's Church (Sint-Maartenskerk in Dutch) is the main church and one of the principal Gothic monuments of Kortrijk (Courtrai), Flanders, Belgium. The church is dedicated to Saint Martin of Tours.

History 
The first gothic Saint Martin's church, was burned down after the battle of Rozenbeke. This church was located at the place where a Roman church once stood (built in 650). The second church was built between 1390 and 1466, some remnants of which were incorporated in the present day church and remain visible.  In 1585, the famous Sacramental tower was constructed in the choir. The current belltower dates from the 19th century, a rebuilding after a fire in 1862 ruined the choir and major parts of the roof and tower.

Amongst the artworks, old works of Gaspar de Crayer can be seen. The organ, dating to 1888, is a major work of Pierre Schyven.

Gallery

See also
 List of tallest structures built before the 20th century

References

External links

site parish Saint-Martin's Kortrijk

Roman Catholic churches in Kortrijk
History of Kortrijk
Roman Catholic churches completed in 1466
15th-century Roman Catholic church buildings in Belgium